Lord Edgware Dies  is a 1934 British mystery film directed by Henry Edwards and starring Austin Trevor, Jane Carr, and Richard Cooper. The film was based on the 1933 Agatha Christie novel Lord Edgware Dies.

Trevor reprised his role as Hercule Poirot for a third time, having previously played him in Alibi and Black Coffee, both released in 1931. Like them, it was filmed at Twickenham Film Studios. While the two earlier films are now lost, this production still survives.

During Julius Hagen's tenure at Twickenham, the studios had specialised in production of murder mysteries as quota quickies. Although Hagen undoubtedly had ambitions for this film to be a more prestigious production, with a larger budget, the similarities to the studio's more routine output led most cinemas to show it as a second feature. The film's sets were designed by the art director James Carter.

Synopsis
Hercule Poirot is hired by Lady Edgware an American actress who wants him to arrange a divorce from her aristocratic husband. In fact it turns out that Lord Edgware has already agreed to a divorce, only for him to be murdered the same night.

Cast
 Austin Trevor as Hercule Poirot
 Jane Carr as Lady Edgware
 Richard Cooper as Captain Hastings
 John Turnbull as Inspector Japp
 Michael Shepley as Captain Roland Marsh
 Leslie Perrins as Bryan Martin
 C. V. France as Lord Edgware
 Kynaston Reeves as Duke of Merton
 Phyllis Morris as Alice
 Sophie Stewart as Miss Geraldine Edgware

References

Bibliography
 Chibnall, Steve. Quota Quickies: The Birth of the British 'B' Film. British Film Institute, 2007.
 Low, Rachael. Filmmaking in 1930s Britain. George Allen & Unwin, 1985.
 Wood, Linda. British Films, 1927-1939. British Film Institute, 1986.

External links
 Lord Edgware Dies at IMDB
 

1934 films
British detective films
1930s English-language films
Films based on Hercule Poirot books
British mystery drama films
Films set in London
Films shot at Twickenham Film Studios
British black-and-white films
Films directed by Henry Edwards
1930s mystery drama films
1934 drama films
1930s British films